Maritime English may refer to:
 Atlantic Canadian English, a Canadian dialect of English
 Standard Marine Communication Phrases,  a set of key phrases for use at sea
 International Maritime English Testing System (IMETS), developed by T.E.A Ltd. with Plymouth University

See also 
 Maritime (disambiguation)